Communauté d'agglomération Valenciennes Métropole is the communauté d'agglomération, an intercommunal structure, centred on the city of Valenciennes. It is located in the Nord department, in the Hauts-de-France region, northern France. It was created in December 2000. Its area is 263.5 km2. Its population was 192,787 in 2018, of which 43,405 in Valenciennes proper.

History 
The agglomeration community of Valenciennes Métropole was created by a prefectural decree of December 22, 2000 which took effect on December 31, 2000 by the merger of communauté de communes de la vallée de l'Escaut, communauté de communes du Pays de Condé and syndicat intercommunal à vocation Multiple (SIVOM) de Trith-Saint-Léger et environs.

On January 1, 2005, the commune of Escautpont left the intercommunality to join the Communauté d'agglomération de la Porte du Hainaut.

Composition 
The communauté d'agglomération consists of the following 35 communes:

Anzin
Artres
Aubry-du-Hainaut
Aulnoy-lez-Valenciennes
Beuvrages
Bruay-sur-l'Escaut
Condé-sur-l'Escaut
Crespin
Curgies
Estreux
Famars
Fresnes-sur-Escaut
Hergnies
Maing
Marly
Monchaux-sur-Écaillon
Odomez
Onnaing
Petite-Forêt
Préseau
Prouvy
Quarouble
Quérénaing
Quiévrechain
Rombies-et-Marchipont
Rouvignies
Saint-Aybert
Saint-Saulve
Saultain
Sebourg
Thivencelle
Valenciennes
Verchain-Maugré
Vicq
Vieux-Condé

References

Valenciennes
Valenciennes